Hugo Hammar (1864 - 1947) was a Swedish businessman.

1864 births
1947 deaths
Chalmers University of Technology alumni
Members of the Royal Swedish Academy of Engineering Sciences
Swedish businesspeople